Saposoa is a town in Northern Peru, capital of the province Huallaga in the region San Martín. There are 12 951 inhabitants, according to the 2007 census.

It is served by Saposoa Airport.

References

External links
Satellite map at Maplandia

Populated places in the San Martín Region